is a railway station in the city of Numazu, Shizuoka Prefecture, Japan, on the Tōkaidō Main Line, operated by Central Japan Railway Company (JR Central).

Lines
Hara Station is served by the Tōkaidō Main Line, and is located 132.8 kilometers from the starting point of the line at Tokyo Station.

Station layout
The station has a single side platform serving Track 1 and an island platform serving Track 2 and Track 3, connected to the station building by a footbridge. Track 1 is not in regular use. The station building has automated ticket machines, TOICA automated turnstiles and a staffed ticket office.

Platforms

Adjacent stations

|-
!colspan=5|Central Japan Railway Company

History
Hara Station was opened on February 25, 1900 as part of the expansion of the Tōkaidō Main Line from Numazu Station to Yoshiwara Station. The original station building was rebuilt in 1948. Regularly scheduled freight services were discontinued from 1984, and charter freight from 1997; however, freight services continue along a privately held spur line to a freight terminal owned by Taiheiyo Cement a short distance from Hara Station. With the privatization of JNR on 1 April 1987, the station came under the control of JR Central.

Station numbering was introduced to the section of the Tōkaidō Line operated JR Central in March 2018; Hara Station was assigned station number CA05.

Passenger statistics
In fiscal 2017, the station was used by an average of 2328 passengers daily (boarding passengers only).

Surrounding area
Hara Junior High School
Hara Elementary School

See also
 List of Railway Stations in Japan

References
Yoshikawa, Fumio. Tokaido-sen 130-nen no ayumi. Grand-Prix Publishing (2002) .

External links

JR Central station information 

Stations of Central Japan Railway Company
Railway stations in Shizuoka Prefecture
Railway stations in Japan opened in 1900
Tōkaidō Main Line
Numazu, Shizuoka